Akirin-2 is a protein that in humans is encoded by the AKIRIN2 gene.

References

External links

Further reading